Espinho Airfield  is a recreational aerodrome serving Espinho in northern Portugal.

Originally built for the military, the aerodrome was later reduced in size and handed over to civilian use. After a deadly accident in 2005, a collision between a PA-28 plane and a car on the nearby road, the aerodrome was closed; it has since only been available to ultralight and model aviation.

The main airport and runway are closed/ built-over, however the Aero Clube da Costa Verde (Portuguese language) operates a flying club and school for light aircraft, marking off  of the original runway's south end for use.

See also
Transport in Portugal
List of airports in Portugal

References

 Great Circle Mapper - Espinho
 Google Earth

Airports in Portugal